Bahrain International is an open international badminton tournament in Bahrain presented by the Bahrain Badminton and Squash Federation, and sanctioned by Badminton World Federation and Badminton Asia. This tournament has been a BWF International Series level, and a part of Bahrain International Badminton Festival. Another tournament for higher tournament level on Bahrain Festival is Bahrain International Challenge.

Previous winners

Performances by countries

References 

Badminton tournaments in Bahrain